May Coup may refer to:
May Coup (Serbia), 1903
May Coup (Poland), 1926
May Coup (South Korea), 1961
28 May 1926 coup d'état, Portugal